Colin Nash is an American attorney and politician serving as a member of the Idaho House of Representatives from the 16B district. Elected in November 2020, he assumed office on December 1, 2020.

Education 
Nash earned a bachelor's degree from Weber State University and a Juris Doctor from the Concordia University School of Law.

Career 
He has worked as an estate planning attorney and worked as a legal intern to State Senator Grant Burgoyne and Representative John McCrostie.

Elections

2020 
Nash defeated Geoff Stephenson in the Democratic primary with 82.28% of the vote. Nash defeated Republican nominee Jacquelyn (Jackie) Davidson with 58.4% of the vote in the general election.

2018 
Nash ran for the open Idaho House of Representatives District Seat B taking second to Rob Mason with 31.9% of the vote, Geoff Stephenson, George Tway, and Barb Vanderpool also ran in the Democratic primary.

References 

Living people
Democratic Party members of the Idaho House of Representatives
Weber State University alumni
Idaho lawyers
People from Boise, Idaho
Year of birth missing (living people)
21st-century American politicians
21st-century American lawyers